The United States government has maintained a variety of vehicles for the president. Because of the president's role as commander-in-chief, military transports are exclusively used for international travel; however, the civilian Secret Service operates the president's motorcade.

Aircraft
Since 1953 whenever the president is on board a military flight its call sign is the name of the armed service followed by the word "One". Thus Air Force One, Army One, Coast Guard One, Marine One, Navy One, and Space Force One. If the president uses a civilian airplane it is designated Executive One.

Automobiles

The presidential state car is a limousine called Cadillac One or The Beast which is operated by the Secret Service. There are at least ten limousines.
There is also a bus unofficially called Ground Force One officially called Stagecoach, while the president is aboard, which is operated by the Secret Service.

Carriages
Four presidential carriages were built by the H & C Studebaker blacksmith shop, the predecessor of the Studebaker Corporation; one of these carried Lincoln to the Ford's Theatre the night of his assassination.
All four carriages are on permanent display at the Studebaker National Museum located in South Bend, Indiana. The carriages were used by Presidents Ulysses S. Grant, Benjamin Harrison, Abraham Lincoln and William McKinley.

Railcars

A number of presidents have traveled by rail. President Abraham Lincoln signed the Pacific Railroad Act in 1862, providing the initial funding for what would become the First transcontinental railroad, linking America from coast to coast in 1869.

At the time, a private railroad car was the equivalent of a private jet today, with the first executive coach built exclusively for the president, a deep maroon painted car named the "United States", completed during Lincoln's term. Wary of the optics such opulence signaled in the aftermath of the Civil War, Lincoln never got the opportunity to enjoy the deluxe accommodations while alive, however it would take Lincoln on his final journey, a slow circuitous trip from Washington, D.C., to Springfield, Illinois, with the remains of his son Willie in a funeral train, retracing the route of his inaugural journey in 1861.

Late 19th and early 20th century presidents would use trains to campaign and travel across the country much as presidents use Air Force One today, conducting whistle stop tours to personally reach voters across the country.

President Franklin D. Roosevelt made extensive use of the railroad in his campaign in 1933, and traveled across the country during World War 2 aboard U.S. Car No. 1, a train composed of the Ferdinand Magellan executive car, a converted hospital car with high-tech radio gear installed for communications, a baggage car to carry the Sunshine Special and other support vehicles, and other cars to accommodate press and the secret service.

The Ferdinand Magellan was a Pullman Company business car pulled from charter service, armor plated, and rebuilt into living quarters and office for FDR in 1941. It is currently on static display at the Gold Coast Railroad Museum in Miami-Dade County, Florida. The Ferdinand Magellan was last used by President Ronald Reagan, who used the coach during his re-election campaign in 1984.

The Georgia 300 is a privately owned rail car that has been used by several presidents during whistle stop campaign tours. Georgia 300 has hosted Presidents George H. W. Bush, Bill Clinton, and Barack Obama.

George H. W. Bush was the first president to travel by train as part of his funeral arrangements in almost 50 years, traveling aboard Union Pacific 4141, an EMD SD70 which had been painted in Air Force One livery and named in his honor in 2005. The last president to have a funeral train was Dwight D. Eisenhower, who made his final journey from Washington D.C. to his hometown in Abilene, Kansas, where he was laid to rest in 1969.

Current President Joe Biden frequently made use of commercial Amtrak service to commute between Washington D.C. and his home in Delaware during his time as senator, and briefly campaigned via train in Ohio and Pennsylvania, however, it is yet to been seen if he will be able to continue the tradition of presidential railcars during his term. During his surprise visit to Ukraine on 21 February 2023, he travelled in a revamped private carriage of the Ukrainian Railways Service dubbed 'Rail Force One'.

Yachts

From 1880 to 1977 several commissioned Navy ships served as presidential yachts, however this practice was halted during the Carter administration. The table below lists the name of each of these ships and the years in which it did so.

See also
 List of official vehicles of the president of the United States
 Air transports of heads of state and government
 Coach (carriage)
 Official state car
 Royal yacht

References

Presidency of the United States